Estonia first participated at the European Youth Olympic Festival in 1993 and has earned medals at both summer and winter festivals.

Medal tables

Medals by Summer Youth Olympic Festival

Medals by Winter Youth Olympic Festival

List of medalists

Summer Festivals

Winter Festivals

See also
Estonia at the Youth Olympics
Estonia at the Olympics

References

External links
Noorte olümpiavõistlused eok.ee 
Estonia's participation and results 1997–2009

Youth sport in Estonia
Nations at the European Youth Olympic Festival
Estonia at multi-sport events